Usman "Uzzy" Ahmed (born 21 November 1981) is a British former professional boxer who competed from 2006 to 2016. He challenged once for the British and Commonwealth flyweight titles in 2009.

Professional career
Ahmed lost on his professional debut via points decision over six rounds to Chris Edwards on 30 September 2006, at the Kings Hall in Stoke-on-Trent.

In his eighth fight, with a record of 5–1–1, he fought Chris Edwards in a rematch on 29 May 2009 at the Fenton Manor Sports Complex, Stoke-on-Trent, with Edwards' British and Commonwealth flyweight titles on the line. Ahmed lost the fight by unanimous decision, with two judges scoring the bout 118–109 and the third scoring it 117–111.

His next fight was a four round points decision victory over Kyle King in December 2009, at the Newport Centre in Newport, Wales. One month later he challenged Ashley Sexton for the vacant English flyweight title, losing via first round knockout (KO). Footage from the fight, showing Ahmed dancing to the ring and then being knocked unconscious with an overhand right became a viral hit online.

On 12 October 2011, he fought Don Broadhurst at the Olympia in Liverpool as part of the Prizefighter Series' super flyweight edition. Ahmed lost by unanimous decision over three rounds.

On 23 May 2015, 18 months after his last fight, Ahmed lost a six round points decision to Jamie Williams at the Britannia Hotel in Nottingham. 7 months later, on 13 December, he faced Williams in a rematch at the Hermitage Leisure Centre in Whitwick, this time with the vacant Midlands Area flyweight title on the line, fighting to a points draw over ten rounds. He then fought Williams for a third time on 23 October 2016, at the Hermitage Leisure Centre, again for the vacant Midlands Area flyweight title, this time losing by eighth round technical knockout (TKO). This would be Ahmed's final fight of his professional career.

Professional boxing record

| style="text-align:center;" colspan="8"|8 Wins, 9 Losses, 2 Draws
|- style="text-align:center; background:#e3e3e3;"
|  style="border-style:none none solid solid; "|Res.
|  style="border-style:none none solid solid; "|Record
|  style="border-style:none none solid solid; "|Opponent
|  style="border-style:none none solid solid; "|Type
|  style="border-style:none none solid solid; "|Rd., Time
|  style="border-style:none none solid solid; "|Date
|  style="border-style:none none solid solid; "|Location
|  style="border-style:none none solid solid; "|'''Notes

References

External links
 

1981 births
English male boxers
Super-flyweight boxers
English people of Pakistani descent
Living people
Boxers from Derby
British sportspeople of Pakistani descent